Babubhai Thiba (born 14 Nov 1950), is an Indian film producer, consultant and a Celebrity Manager and is primarily known for his work in Hindi films. He is the father of Mona Thiba, a well-known Gujarati cinema actress.

Early life and education
Babubhai Thiba was born in Rajkot, Gujarat to a financially humble family and later he completed his Master of Arts and diploma in Journalism and Mass Media Communication  from Ahmedabad, Gujarat.

Career

Babubhai Thiba came to Mumbai in 1972 and started his career as a celebrity manager, but later he was known in the entertainment industry mainly-as a producer, as consultant and a manager. Thiba has been a producer for many films, TV shows and ad films.  He has produced movies such as Dilwale Kabhi Na Hare, and Dil Lagake Dekho. 
In a career span of over 3 decades, Mr. Thiba has also established a network in the Gujarati cinema and has produced movies such as Paraki Thapan, Pankhi No Malo and Pooja Na Phool. 
Babubhai Thiba has also produced TV serials such as MR.Dhansukh which featured Kader Khan in a lead role and was aired on Doordarshan. He has also produced TV shows such as Haal Kaisa Hai Janab Ka, Bachelor, and Badalte Rishtey.

Babubhai is the Chairman of Television Division and the Treasurer of Indian Motion Picture Producers Association (IMPPA) and National General Secretary of Shree Bhartiya Janta TV & Cine Kaamgar Sangh.

Achievement
He is the treasurer and convener of Television- Indian Motion Picture Producers Association (IMPPA)

References

External links

 Babubhai Thiba Official Website

1950 births
Hindi film producers
Film producers from Mumbai
Living people